MS  Bergensfjord was an ocean liner built in 1955 by Swan, Hunter & Wigham Richardson Ltd, for Norwegian America Line. She was of 18,739 gross register tons, and could carry 878 passengers. She would had a uneventful career with her original owners until she was sold to the Compagnie Générale Transatlantique in 1971, than to the horeson & Company and Bruusgaard Kiosterud & Co, before she was sold to the Aphrodite Maritime Co. She was sunk in 1980 after a fire broke out on board.

Career

Early years
In 1954, Norwegian America Line placed an order with Swan Hunter shipyard in Wallsend-on-Tyne, England for a new liner that would be an updated and improved version of MS Oslofjord. The ship had a longer aft superstructure than the Oslofjord for more passenger space, featured air conditioning throughout her passenger and crew area, and private bathrooms which were not common for ships of the time. She was also designed for easy conversion to a single-class ship with cruising duties in mind. She had accommodations for 878 passengers but only 360 in cruising service. The new ship was launched as intended in 1955 and was delivered to the line in May of 1956, setting out on her maiden voyage from Oslo to New York route on May 31, arriving in New York harbor on June 9. From 1956-1971, Bergensfjord operated transatlantic crossings during the warmer months, with cruises during the winter. But as airline competition increased during the 1960s and ocean liners became less profitable, the company decided to put Bergensfjord up for sale.

Later years
After she was put up for sale, she was sold to the Compagnie Generale Transatlantique and was renamed to the De Grasse as a replacement for their ship Antilles servicing the Caribbean route. Unfortunately she was not as successful as her new owners expected and so the ship was retired and placed up for sale in 1973. She was sold to the Singapore-based Rasa Sayang Cruises and joint venture of Norwegian shipping forms Thoreson & Company and Bruusgaard Kiosterud & Co. She was renamed Rasa Sayang and she was then utilized for long-distance cruises including around-the-world trips. Unfortunately, her career came to an end in 1977 and she was laid up. She was sold to Cypriot-based Sunlit Cruises and renamed Golden Moon. She was then sold to the Aphrodite Maritime Co.

Fate
On August 27, 1980, disaster struck. During her reconstruction, a fire broke out on board. It spread very rapidly, quickly consuming the ageing liner, and overnight she rolled over to starboard, coming to rest on the bottom of the shallow harbour. Her wreck still remained in her original position.

References

External links
M/S BERGENSFJORD. (in Swedish)
Miramar Ship Index, BERGENSFJORD

Ocean liners
Passenger ships of Norway
Norwegian America Line
1955 ships